For lands administrative purposes, New South Wales is divided into  141 counties, which are further divided into parishes. The counties were first set down in the Colony of New South Wales, which later became the Australian state of New South Wales.

The counties were further subdivided into 7,419 parishes. There are also three land divisions, approximately one hundred land districts, and several other types of districts as well as land boards used at various periods. There were also thirteen hundreds proclaimed in Cumberland County, which were later abolished. These divisions are part of the lands administrative divisions of Australia. Unlike the local government areas of New South Wales, which have gone through restructuring periods by the government, the counties have been the same since the nineteenth century.

Creation of county areas

The first county proclaimed was Cumberland on 4 June 1788. Northumberland was named in 1804. Several other counties were established around Sydney; by the 1820s there were nine counties (see 1828 and 1832 maps). They were: Roxburgh, Northumberland, Durham, Westmoreland, Cumberland, Argyle, Camden, Ayr and Cambridge. They were in the approximate area of the present day cadastral units except that some of them were larger and took up land which was in 1834 assigned to other counties. Ayr and Cambridge were not used in the 1834 counties, taking up area which is approximately in what became Macquarie County and Brisbane County.

Instructions were given to Governor Brisbane in 1825 to survey New South Wales and divide it into counties of various sizes, hundreds, and parishes between 15 and 25 square miles (40 and 65 km²). The Nineteen Counties were surveyed by Thomas Mitchell in 1834. Thirteen hundreds were proclaimed in Cumberland county, but not in anywhere else in New South Wales, and these were repealed in 1888.

As the counties are based on area, rather than population, there are huge differences in the populations of the coastal counties with those for the remote west. The whole of Sydney with several million people is located within Cumberland County, while there are many counties for areas in the Far West which have a very low population.

Use
The counties have little official function and are only now used for land titles and geographic surveying, and as an area of coverage within some industrial awards. Yancowinna County is also legally the only part of the state in the South Australian time zone.

A number of water supply authorities are named County Council, but only Rous County Council has the same name as its cadastral county.

Genealogy records from the nineteenth and early twentieth centuries for New South Wales commonly use the town name followed by the county. The 1911 Britannica lists all towns in New South Wales the same way, such as Albury, Goulburn county, Broken Hill, Yancowinna county and Wagga-Wagga, Wynyard county.

Early land districts
Parts of the land which were outside the Nineteen Counties were divided into squatting districts in the early nineteenth century . In 1846 New South Wales was divided into settled districts, intermediate districts and unsettled districts. In 1861 the system of settled and unsettled districts were abolished with the Crown Lands Acts, while new types of districts called first and second class settled districts, as well as town land and suburban land came into being. The various districts used:
 Albert District (west of the Darling River). Erected 4 November 1851. Warrego District was split off in 1862.
 Bligh District, east of the Macquarie River. Erected 22 May 1839. (1841 population of 402, with 118,341 sheep and 24,064 cattle)  In 1852, it was described as being 5 million acres (20,000 km²), with 140,000 sheep, 40,000 cattle and 2,000 horses.
 Clarence River District. Erected 1 March 1842, from Port Macquarie District. In 1852, it was described as being 5 million acres (20,000 km²), with 200,000 sheep, 40,000 cattle and 2,000 horses.
 Gwydir District (Moree area). Erected 4 Dec 1847, subdivided from Liverpool Plains district.
 Lachlan District – between the Lachlan River and Murrumbidgee River. Erected 22 May 1839. (1841 population of 792, with 111,154 sheep and 57,920 cattle) 
 Liverpool Plains District. Erected 22 May 1839; Gwydir was split off in 1847. (1841 population of 1012, with 230,102 sheep, 102,738 cattle and 1045 horses)  In 1852, it was described as being larger than 10 million acres (40,000 km²), with 400,000 sheep, 220,000 cattle and 4,000 horses. There was an Electoral district of Liverpool Plains in the same area in the nineteenth century, and the Liverpool Plains Shire is the modern shire.
 Lower Darling District (east of the Darling River). Erected 4 December 1847; later called simply Darling.
 Maneroo District (south coast, now called Monaro) - south of the Moruya River and Queanbeyan River, and east of the Murrumbidgee River. Erected 22 May 1839 (1841 population of 1554, with 230,130 sheep, 78,473 cattle and 2133 horses). In 1852, it was described as having 400,000 sheep, 115,000 cattle and 5,000 horses.
 Macleay River District. Erected 1 March 1842 from out of Port Macquarie District.
 Murrumbidgee District (between the Murrumbidgee and Murray rivers). Erected 22 May 1839. (1841 population of 1139, with 180,654 sheep and 62,848 cattle)  In 1852, it was described as being 12 million acres (49,000 km²), with 400,000 sheep, 100,000 cattle and 3,000 horses.
 New England District. Erected 22 May 1839. (New England region (1841 population of 702 with 201,926 sheep and 13,830 cattle) 
 Port Macquarie District. (1841 population of 287, with 11,642 sheep and 5,885 cattle). Erected 22 May 1839. Subdivided into Clarence and Macleay in 1842.
 Warrego District (between Darling River and Queensland border in the north). Erected 8 August 1862, from out of Albert District.
 Wellington District, between the Lachlan River and Macquarie River. Erected 22 May 1839. (1841 population of 656, with 119,441 sheep and 26,370 cattle)

Land divisions, boards and districts

The Crown Lands Act of 1884 further divided New South Wales into three land divisions; Western, Central and Eastern; as well as Land Boards and Land Districts. This 1890 map shows 14 land boards and 95 land districts; while a 1907 map shows 13 land boards and 103 land districts. The new land districts were different from the previous land districts which had mostly been used in the western areas of the state before counties were proclaimed there. The land boards were named after the location of the head office. The table below shows the land districts used in 1890 and 1907 (some of the locations of the land boards changed and there were new land districts), with the land boards and land divisions:

Table of counties

See also

 Land and Valuation Court of New South Wales
 Lands administrative divisions of Australia

References

External links
 NSW Department of Lands Parish map preservation project
 National Library of Australia, Cadastral maps
 State Records NSW - County and parish maps
 MapLover - County and parish maps
 Map of New South Wales including Lord Howe Island, showing land districts and land board districts (1952)

History of New South Wales
Geography of New South Wales
Cadastral divisions New South Wales
Cadastral divisions